= Renaissance Place (mall) =

Coordinates: 42.186°N 87.8021°W

The Renaissance Place is one of the first "new urbanist" mixed-use developments of its kind located in the Chicago suburb of Highland Park, Illinois. It was designed in a vernacular style respectful of the history of this place. It includes several different buildings and styles of architecture appropriate for each use. The project opened in late 2007, and was home to the third Saks Fifth Avenue location in Illinois until it closed in December 2012. Even though it is a new development, occupancy is almost 100%. Above street-level retailers are condominiums, offices and a fine arts movie theater served by underground parking, grade level parking and street parking. The development has been featured in the 2005 Urban Land Institute Handbook on Mixed Use Development; the 2003 Urban Land Institute Handbook on Town Center Development; and the 2002 Urban Land Institute Handbook on Place Making: Developing Town Centers, Main Streets and Urban Villages. The facility was master planned and designed by the international architectural firm of Suttle Mindlin and has been a major factor in the revitalization of downtown Highland Park.
